John Richard Butler (June 2, 1926 — June 20, 2000) was a Canadian professional ice hockey right wing who played seven games in the National Hockey League with the Chicago Black Hawks during the 1947–48 season. The rest of his career, which lasted from 1946 to 1954, was spent in various minor leagues. 

Butler was born in Delisle, Saskatchewan. He played junior hockey for the Trail Smoke Eaters and the Moose Jaw Canucks. In 1946, Butler became a professional with the Kansas City Pla-Mors. The following season, Butler played seven games with the Black Hawks. It was his only NHL experience. Butler would continue in minor and senior hockey until 1958.

Career statistics

Regular season and playoffs

External links
 

1926 births
2000 deaths
Calgary Stampeders (WHL) players
Canadian ice hockey right wingers
Chicago Blackhawks players
Hershey Bears players
Ice hockey people from Saskatchewan
Kansas City Pla-Mors players
Tulsa Oilers (USHL) players
20th-century Canadian people